Jeene Ki Arzoo is a 1981 Indian Hindi-language action film directed by Rajasekhar and produced by AVM Productions. The film stars Mithun Chakraborty, Rakesh Roshan, Rati Agnihotri, Bindiya Goswami and Sujit Kumar. It is a remake of Rajasekhar's own Telugu film Punnami Nagu starring Charanjeevi /Kannada film Hunnimeya Rathriyalli.

Plot 
Before dying, the village priest curses the snake charmer, Raka for killing him and making his son Ravi (Rakesh Roshan) an orphan. Poor Ravi is taken care of by the village landlord who adopts him and makes him the brother of his daughter Poonam. Years pass by and it's time for Raka to pay for his sins. His only son Nagraj (Mithun Chakraborty) becomes the victim of the curse where he will be incarnated as a snake, killing anyone who makes contact with him. Things take a dramatic turn with the mysterious death of Poonam. Ravi investigates his sister's death to find out Nagraj is the culprit. Nagraj moonlights as a venomous snake that is out to kill women. Can the dangerous Nagraj be stopped from his killing spree? Will he be freed of the curse?

Cast 

Mithun Chakraborty as Naagraj "Naagi"
Rakesh Roshan as Ravi
Rati Agnihotri as Laxmi
Bindiya Goswami as Poonam
Sujit Kumar as Raka
Rajendranath
Jagdeep
Jayamalini

Soundtrack 
Lyrics: Anjaan

References 

 http://www.ibosnetwork.com/asp/filmbodetails.asp?id=Jeene+Ki+Arzoo
 https://archive.today/20130126121956/http://www.indimaza.com/watch/161406/jeene-ki-arzoo--full-length-hindi-movie--mithun-chakraborty-and-rakesh-roshan.html

External links 
 

1980s Hindi-language films
1981 action films
1981 films
AVM Productions films
Films directed by Rajasekhar (director)
Films scored by Bappi Lahiri
Hindi remakes of Kannada films
Indian action films